The 1986–87 season was the 78th year of football played by Dundee United, and covers the period from 1 July 1986 to 30 June 1987. United finished in third place, securing UEFA Cup football for the following season.  They reached the Scottish Cup final, only to lose after extra-time to St Mirren.  The season is most notable for the club's run to the UEFA Cup Final, knocking out Barcelona, Borussia Mönchengladbach and Universitatea Craiova en route.  United lost 2–1 on aggregate to IFK Gothenburg in the final.

Match results
Dundee United played a total of 67 competitive matches during the 1986–87 season. The team finished third in the Scottish Premier Division.

In the cup competitions, United lost in the final of the Scottish Cup to St Mirren and lost in the Skol Cup semi-finals. Swedish side Gothenburg defeated United in the final of the UEFA Cup over two legs.

Legend

All results are written with Dundee United's score first.

Premier Division

Scottish Cup

Skol Cup

UEFA Cup

Player details
During the 1986–87 season, United used 29 different players comprising four nationalities. Billy Thomson was the only player to feature in every match of United's UEFA Cup run. The table below shows the number of appearances and goals scored by each player.

|}

Goalscorers
United had 15 players score with the team scoring 97 goals in total. The top goalscorer was Iain Ferguson, who finished the season with 28 goals.

Discipline
During the 1986–87 season, one United players was sent off. Statistics for cautions are unavailable.

Team statistics

League table

Transfers

In
The club signed five players during the season with a total public cost of at least £300,000 (some figures unknown). Two other players joined before the following season.

*Dave Bowman and Jim McInally were signed in a joint £140,000 deal

Out
Four players were sold by the club during the season with a public total of nearly £1,000,000. One player retired due to injury.

Loans out

Playing kit

The shirts were sponsored by future chairman Eddie Thompson's VG Foodstores for a second season.

See also
1986–87 in Scottish football

References

External links
BBC's 'A Sporting Nation' review of the UEFA Cup run
Glenrothes Arabs 1986–87 season review

1986-87
Scottish football clubs 1986–87 season